Liepiņa is a surname. Notable people with the surname include:

Anita Liepiņa (born 1967), Latvian athlete
Lidija Liepiņa (1891–1985), Latvian chemist 
Līga Liepiņa (born 1946), Latvian actress
Linda Liepiņa (born 1974), Latvian businesswoman and politician

Surnames of Latvian origin